Celebrate Mistakes is the first full-length album by American indie rock band Number One Gun, released on August 12, 2003.

Track listing
All tracks are written by Jeff Schneeweis.

References

External links

Number One Gun albums
2003 debut albums